Jung District (literally central district) is a gu in southern central Busan, South Korea. It has an area of 2.8 km², and a population of about 48,000.

Administrative divisions

Jung-gu is divided into 8 legal dong, which all together comprise 9 administrative dong, as follows:

Jungang-dong
Donggwang-dong
Daecheong-dong
Bosu-dong
Bupyong-dong
Gwangbok-dong
Nampo-dong
Yeongju-dong (2 administrative dong)

Cityscape

References

External links
 Jung-gu website 
 Jung-gu-City of Busan

See also 

 Geography of South Korea

 
Districts of Busan